is a Japanese TV station affiliated with Fuji News Network (FNN) and Fuji Network System (FNS) in Fukuoka. This station serves Fukuoka Prefecture and also acts as the default FNN affiliate for western portions of Yamaguchi Prefecture including Yamaguchi City and Shimonoseki, as Yamaguchi Prefecture does not have an FNN affiliate of its own.

History
JOHX-TV was originally established as an affiliate of Nippon News Network (NNN) and Nippon Television Network System (NNS) in Yahata (Yahata Higashi-ku, Kitakyūshū) in August 1958, airing on VHF channel 9; a station in Fukuoka was established in February 1962 as JOJY-TV. They changed affiliation from NNN and NNS to FNN and FNS in October 1964. The head office was moved to Fukuoka, and the call sign changed from "JOHX-TV" (still the call sign of Kitakyūshū satellite station (airing on VHF channel 10)) to "JOJY-TV" in December 1974. They relocated their office to its current location near Fukuoka Tower in August 1996. During the station's first 53 years of broadcasting, JOHX-TV's analog signal was receivable over-the-air in most of Yamaguchi Prefecture.

Digital broadcasts on JOJY-TV began on 1 July 2006, and the analog signal continued to broadcast until 24 July 2011, when JOHX-TV (which served northern portions of Fukuoka Prefecture and western portions of Yamaguchi Prefecture) ceased operations.

TV channel

Main station 
  Fukuoka 34ch(Digital) 9ch(Analog)

Tandem offices 
 
Kitakyūshū 29ch(D) 10ch(A:JOHX-TV)
Kurume 29ch(D) 60ch(A) 
Minami Ōmuta 29ch(D) 56ch(A) 
Ōmuta 29ch(D) 55ch(A) 
Yukuhashi 34ch(D) 54ch(A)
Itoshima 34ch(D)
Munakata 29ch(D)

Programs
 
 

BASEBALL SPECIAL Fukuoka SoftBank Hawks Live
Cow Television
Riding Uphill ガチ★星

Other TV stations in Fukuoka
NHK Fukuoka and Kitakyushu
 Kyushu Asahi Broadcasting (KBC, affiliated with TV Asahi and ANN) - 1
 RKB Mainichi Broadcasting (RKB, affiliated with TBS TV, Inc. and JNN) - 4
 Fukuoka Broadcasting Corporation (FBS, affiliated with NTV and NNN / NNS) - 5
 TVQ Kyushu Broadcasting (TVQ, affiliated with TV Tokyo and TX Network) - 7

External links
Official website of TV Nishinippon

Fuji News Network
Companies based in Fukuoka Prefecture
Television stations in Japan
Television channels and stations established in 1958
Mass media in Fukuoka
Dentsu
1958 establishments in Japan